Romania competed at the 1976 Winter Olympics in Innsbruck, Austria.

Alpine skiing

Men

Biathlon

Men

 1 One minute added per close miss (a hit in the outer ring), two minutes added per complete miss.

Men's 4 x 7.5 km relay

 2 A penalty loop of 200 metres had to be skied per missed target.

Bobsleigh

Ice hockey

First round
Winners (in bold) entered the Medal Round. Other teams played a consolation round for 7th-12th places.

|}

Consolation round

Romania 3-1 Japan
Yugoslavia 4-3 Romania
Austria 3-4 Romania
Romania 9-4 Bulgaria
Romania 4-3 Switzerland

References 
 Official Olympic Reports 
 Olympic Winter Games 1976, full results by sports-reference.com

Nations at the 1976 Winter Olympics
1976
1976 in Romanian sport